Hiroshi Katayama (片山 博視, born April 19, 1987) is a Japanese professional baseball pitcher for the Tohoku Rakuten Golden Eagles in Japan's Nippon Professional Baseball.

External links

NPB.com

1987 births
Japanese expatriate baseball players in Australia
Living people
Nippon Professional Baseball pitchers
Baseball people from Hyōgo Prefecture
Tohoku Rakuten Golden Eagles players
Adelaide Bite players